William Henry "Strawberry Bill" Bernhard (March 16, 1871 – March 30, 1949) was an American professional baseball pitcher. He played in Major League Baseball (MLB) from 1899 to 1907 for the Philadelphia Phillies, Philadelphia Athletics, and Cleveland Bronchos / Naps.

After his playing career ended, he became a manager in the Southern Association. He most notably managed the 1908 Southern champion Nashville Vols.

Nashville
Ferdinand E. Kuhn hired him to the position as manager of the Nashville club.

References

External links

1871 births
1949 deaths
Baseball players from New York (state)
Major League Baseball pitchers
Philadelphia Phillies players
Philadelphia Athletics players
Cleveland Bronchos players
Cleveland Naps players
19th-century baseball players
Minor league baseball managers
Nashville Vols managers
Nashville Vols players
Chattanooga Lookouts players
Salt Lake City Bees players
People from Clarence, New York